Morley Field Sports Complex is a sports complex in Balboa Park in San Diego, California. The sports complex was named after John Morley, who served as a park superintendent in Balboa Park from 1911 to 1939.

Athletic facilities

Archery
An archery range is located in the sports complex. San Diego Archers runs events at the range.

Baseball, Softball, & Tee-ball
The sports complex offers multi-purpose ballfields, used for baseball, softball and Tee-ball.

Cross country
The Morley Field cross country running course is a 1.5-mile/5000 meter cross country course in the Morley Field Sports Complex. The Foot Locker Cross Country Championships are held on the cross country course. The San Diego State Aztecs women's cross country team hosts meets at the course.

Cycling
The San Diego Velodrome is a banked 333.3-meter (0.2 mile) oval track cycling race track constructed in 1976. The track has 28-degree banked corners.

Disc golf
A disc golf course is located in the sports complex.

Golf
The Balboa Park Golf Complex contains a public 18-hole golf course and 9-hole executive course.

Lawn Bowling
There are two separate facilities dedicated to lawn bowling: one each for bocce (Italian lawn bowling) and pétanque (French lawn bowling). The bocce courts are located at the northeast portion of the sports complex. The Petanquedrome sits next to the east side of Bud Kearns Memorial Pool.

Swimming & water polo
The Bud Kearns Memorial Pool is located in the sports complex. The pool has 12 swimming lanes at a length of 44 yards and is "ideal for water polo."

Tennis
Maureen Connolly Brinker Stadium, a 1,500 seat tennis stadium dedicated on April 25, 1971 to beloved local tennis legend Maureen Connolly, anchors the Balboa Tennis Club, which includes 24 additional hard courts and other amenities.

See also 
 Balboa Park (San Diego)

References

External links
 Official website

Balboa Park (San Diego)
Baseball venues in California
Basketball venues in California
College cross country courses in the United States
Cross country running courses in California
Golf clubs and courses in California
San Diego State Aztecs
Softball venues in California
Sports venues in San Diego
Swimming venues in California
Tennis venues in California